The 2021–22 Iowa Hawkeyes men's basketball team represented the University of Iowa during the 2021–22 NCAA Division I men's basketball season. The team was led by 12th-year head coach Fran McCaffery and played its home games at Carver–Hawkeye Arena as members of the Big Ten Conference. They finished the season 26–10, 12–8 in Big Ten play to finish in a three-way tie for fourth place. The 26 wins were the most wins in a season for Iowa since the Elite Eight team in 1986–87 earned 30 wins. As the No. 5 seed in the Big Ten tournament, they defeated Northwestern, Rutgers, Indiana, and Purdue to win the tournament championship. As a result, the Hawkeyes received the conference's automatic bid to the NCAA tournament and drew the No. 5 seed in the Midwest region. Despite winning 9 of its previous 10 games and boasting the second-best efficiency margin in Division 1 between February 1 and the start of the tournament, the Hawkeyes were upset by No. 12-seeded Richmond in the First Round.

Sophomore forward Keegan Murray earned consensus First-team All-American honors, and established a new school record for points in a season. It was the third consecutive season that an Iowa player was selected a consensus First-team All-American and set a new school record for points in a season (Luka Garza, 2019–20 and 2020–21).

Previous season
In a season limited due to the ongoing COVID-19 pandemic, the Hawkeyes finished the 2020–21 season 22–9, 14–6 in Big Ten play to finish in third place. They defeated Wisconsin in the quarterfinal round of the Big Ten tournament before losing to Illinois in the semifinals. The Hawkeyes received an at-large bid to the NCAA tournament as the No. 2 seed in the West region. They defeated Grand Canyon in the First Round before losing to Oregon in the Second Round, ending their chances at their first Sweet Sixteen since 1999. Iowa spent all but two weeks of the season ranked in the top 10 of the AP poll and ended with a No. 8 ranking.

Senior center Luka Garza was named Big Ten Player of the Year and a consensus All-American for the second consecutive season. He was also named the consensus National Player of the Year and ended his career with a school-record 2,306 points (seventh in Big Ten history). After his last home game in a Hawkeye uniform, it was announced that his No. 55 jersey would be retired. Senior guard Jordan Bohannon ended the season with school-records of 639 assists and 364 three-point field goals (second in Big Ten history).

Offseason

Returning players
Senior guard Jordan Bohannon announced on April 26 that he would return to Iowa taking advantage of the extra year of eligibility from the NCAA due to the COVID-19 pandemic.

Departures

Incoming transfers

2021 recruiting class

Roster

 
Source

Depth chart

Schedule and results

|-
!colspan=9 style=|Exhibition

|-
!colspan=9 style=|Regular season

|-
!colspan=9 style=|Big Ten tournament

|-
!colspan=9 style=|NCAA tournament

Source

Rankings

^Coaches did not release a Week 1 poll.

References

Iowa
Iowa
Iowa Hawkeyes men's basketball seasons
Hawk
Hawk